Big River is a census-designated place (CDP) in San Bernardino County, California, United States. The population was 1,327 at the 2010 census, up from 1,266 at the 2000 census.

Geography
Big River is located on the west bank of the Colorado River at  (34.134021, -114.369782).

Parks and Recreation
Parks in Big River are administered by the Big River Community Service District

Demographics

2010
At the 2010 census Big River had a population of 1,327. The racial makeup of Big River was 1,137 (85.7%) White (79.5% Non-Hispanic White), 14 (1.1%) African American, 50 (3.8%) Native American, 2 (0.2%) Asian, 0 (0.0%) Pacific Islander, 54 (4.1%) from other races, and 70 (5.3%) from two or more races. Hispanic or Latino of any race were 160 people (12.1%).

The whole population lived in households, no one lived in non-institutionalized group quarters and no one was institutionalized.

There were 640 households, 116 (18.1%) had children under the age of 18 living in them, 268 (41.9%) were opposite-sex married couples living together, 67 (10.5%) had a female householder with no husband present, 38 (5.9%) had a male householder with no wife present.  There were 44 (6.9%) unmarried opposite-sex partnerships, and 9 (1.4%) same-sex married couples or partnerships. 216 households (33.8%) were one person and 134 (20.9%) had someone living alone who was 65 or older. The average household size was 2.07.  There were 373 families (58.3% of households); the average family size was 2.56.

The age distribution was 192 people (14.5%) under the age of 18, 68 people (5.1%) aged 18 to 24, 174 people (13.1%) aged 25 to 44, 429 people (32.3%) aged 45 to 64, and 464 people (35.0%) who were 65 or older.  The median age was 54.9 years. For every 100 females, there were 100.8 males.  For every 100 females age 18 and over, there were 98.4 males.

There were 1,064 housing units at an average density of 93.7 per square mile, of the occupied units 509 (79.5%) were owner-occupied and 131 (20.5%) were rented. The homeowner vacancy rate was 3.8%; the rental vacancy rate was 34.1%.  1,009 people (76.0% of the population) lived in owner-occupied housing units and 318 people (24.0%) lived in rental housing units.

According to the 2010 United States Census, Big River had a median household income of $29,063, with 11.8% of the population living below the federal poverty line.

2000
At the 2000 census there were 1,266 people, 570 households, and 369 families in the CDP. The population density was 116.0 inhabitants per square mile (44.8/km). The racial makeup of the CDP was 84.9% White, 2.5% African American, 2.5% Native American, 1.0% Asian, 6.3% from other races, and 2.8% from two or more races. Hispanic or Latino of any race were 9.6%.

Of the 570 households 17.2% had children under the age of 18 living with them, 51.8% were married couples living together, 8.8% had a female householder with no husband present, and 35.1% were non-families. 27.7% of households were one person and 15.8% were one person aged 65 or older.  The average household size was 2.22 and the average family size was 2.66.

The age distribution was 19.3% under the age of 18, 4.1% from 18 to 24, 18.6% from 25 to 44, 26.4% from 45 to 64, and 31.7% 65 or older.  The median age was 53 years. For every 100 females, there were 91.5 males.  For every 100 females age 18 and over, there were 91.7 males.

The median household income was $23,488 and the median family income  was $26,250. Males had a median income of $25,000 versus $20,125 for females. The per capita income for the CDP was $13,862.  About 13.1% of families and 18.5% of the population were below the poverty line, including 26.3% of those under age 18 and 8.6% of those age 65 or over.

Government

References

Census-designated places in San Bernardino County, California
Communities in the Lower Colorado River Valley
Populated places in the Sonoran Desert
Census-designated places in California
California populated places on the Colorado River